Thomas Mayanja also known as THE MITH, is a Ugandan Hip-hop artist, Songwriter, Podcaster known for his lyricism and love for Uganda. Mayanja began his career with the Ugandan Hip-hop group KLEAR KUT, and has also seen success in his solo career. Mayanja is known both for his music, his I'M SO UG t-shirt line, and THE SO UG PODCAST. He is responsible for 3 critically acclaimed albums, The Week Of September, Destination Africa and The Ugandan, and 3 lyrical mixtapes, September Reign Vol I,  The Feature Mixtape and Road2DestinationAfrica.

Music
Mayanja started his music career in 1999 with KLEAR KUT. The group of five comprising Navio, Papito, Abba Lang, JB, and Mayanja, had the first Ugandan video to air on MTV. It was also nominated at the 2002 Kora All Africa Music Awards in the Most Promising African Group and Revelation of the Year categories with the hit single "All I Wanna Know"" featuring Juliana Kanyomozi. 

Mayanja has released three albums, "The Week Of September", "Destination Africa" and "The Ugandan" and 3 mixtapes, "September Reign Vol. 1", "The Feature Mixtape" and "The Road To Destiantion Africa". He has also had successful singles like "Fire", "Eh Mama", "Boss Vaawo", "Go Hard", "Nze Wuwo", "I Give Her Love" He has appeared in international collaborations with 2 Face Idibia (Nigeria), Khaligraph (Kenya), A.Y (Tanzania), Ikechukwu Killz (Nigeria), J Town (Ghana), Ice Prince (Nigeria) and more.

Mayanja has been nominated for and won several awards throughout his career. Most recently winning Song Of The Year at the MTN UG HIp-Hop AWARDS for his single "I Give Her Love" off his "The Ugandan" album featuring Herbert Ssensamba.

Discography
Albums:

 The Week Of September, 2012 -  https://tidal.com/album/107091996
 Destination Africa, 2014 - https://tidal.com/album/107092023
 The Ugandan, 2020 - https://ampl.ink/omw34 

Mixtapes:

 September Reign Vol I, 2009
 The Feature Mixtape, 2013
 The Road To Destiantion Africa, 2014

References
https://www.newvision.co.ug/new_vision/news/1231397/mith-releases-album  -  September Reign (Volume 1)

https://www.newvision.co.ug/new_vision/news/1303283/-mith-september   -   The Week Of September 

https://observer.ug/lifestyle/entertainment/34441--the-mith-releases-destination-africa   -   Destination Africa release party

https://mbu.ug/2020/10/20/the-mith-soars-with-16-track-the-ugandan-music-album/   - The Ugandan review

https://www.sqoop.co.ug/202204/four-one-one/the-mith-changes-strategy.html  - The So UG Podcast

https://www.theclancompany.com/album-review-the-ugandan-independence-day-special/  - The Ugandan

External links 
https://instagram.com/themithmusic  - Instagram 
https://www.facebook.com/themithmusic  - Facebook 
https://twitter.com/themithmusic?s=11&t=BL8vtS4Svc9_hSsdFAgXpg  - Twitter
https://youtube.com/user/TheMithVideos  - Youtube
TheMithMedia  - Soundcloud
https://ampl.ink/omw34  - The Ugandan Album
https://open.spotify.com/artist/1xGpeTWvpYbkDTpP5dXyNf  - Spotify
https://heylink.me/THEMITH/  - TheMithMusic

 
Ugandan musicians 
Living people 
Year of birth missing (living people) 
People from Kampala 
Kumusha